Thala evelynae is a species of sea snail, a marine gastropod mollusk, in the family Costellariidae, the ribbed miters.

Description
The length of the shell attains 6.2 mm.

Distribution
This marine species occurs off the Philippines.

References

Costellariidae